Clarksville is a village in Clinton County, Ohio, United States. The population was 548 at the 2010 census. It is served by the Clinton Massie branch of the Wilmington Public Library of Clinton County.

History
Clarksville was laid out in 1816. The village was named after Sarah Clark Hadley, the wife of an early settler.

Geography
Clarksville is located at  (39.403035, -83.982541).

Demographics

2010 census
As of the census of 2010, there were 548 people, 204 households, and 145 families living in the village. The racial makeup of the village was 96.0% White, 0.2% Native American, 2.2% Asian, 0.9% from other races, and 0.7% from two or more races. Hispanic or Latino of any race were 0.9% of the population.

There were 204 households, of which 42.2% had children under the age of 18 living with them, 43.6% were married couples living together, 16.2% had a female householder with no husband present, 11.3% had a male householder with no wife present, and 28.9% were non-families. 22.1% of all households were made up of individuals, and 7.4% had someone living alone who was 65 years of age or older. The average household size was 2.69 and the average family size was 3.12.

The median age in the village was 31.5 years. 31.4% of residents were under the age of 18; 8.3% were between the ages of 18 and 24; 28.4% were from 25 to 44; 24.5% were from 45 to 64; and 7.3% were 65 years of age or older. The gender makeup of the village was 51.3% male and 48.7% female.

2000 census
As of the census of 2000, there were 497 people, 191 households, and 136 families living in the village. The population density was 1,023.7 people per square mile (391.6/km2). There were 216 housing units at an average density of 444.9 per square mile (170.2/km2). The racial makeup of the village was 96.58% White, 0.40% African American, 1.01% Native American, 0.20% Asian, 0.20% from other races, and 1.61% from two or more races. Hispanic or Latino of any race were 1.01% of the population.

There were 191 households, out of which 40.3% had children under the age of 18 living with them, 51.8% were married couples living together, 13.1% had a female householder with no husband present, and 28.3% were non-families. 22.5% of all households were made up of individuals, and 6.3% had someone living alone who was 65 years of age or older. The average household size was 2.60 and the average family size was 3.02.

In the village, the population was spread out, with 28.2% under the age of 18, 9.7% from 18 to 24, 33.8% from 25 to 44, 18.3% from 45 to 64, and 10.1% who were 65 years of age or older. The median age was 31 years. For every 100 females there were 89.7 males. For every 100 females age 18 and over, there were 89.9 males.

The median income for a household in the village was $32,250, and the median income for a family was $39,375. Males had a median income of $31,875 versus $21,328 for females. The per capita income for the village was $14,448. About 6.2% of families and 9.0% of the population were below the poverty line, including 7.3% of those under age 18 and 8.3% of those age 65 or over.

Notable people

Chuck Cleaver, musician
Cliff Rosenberger, Ohio Speaker of the House
Biff Wysong, baseball player

References

Villages in Clinton County, Ohio
Villages in Ohio
Populated places established in 1816
1816 establishments in Ohio